Johann Jakob Baegert (or Jacob Baegert, Jacobo Baegert) (December 22, 1717 – September 29, 1772) was a Jesuit missionary at San Luis Gonzaga in Baja California Sur, Mexico. He is noted for his detailed and acerbic account of the peninsula, the culture of its native inhabitants, and the history of its Spanish exploration and missionization.

Baegert was born in Sélestat, Alsace, the son of a leather worker. Of his three brothers and three sisters, two brothers and two sisters also entered religious orders, and the third brother was a secular priest. Baegert began his Jesuit novitiate at Mainz in 1736 and received further training at Mannheim and Molsheim. After serving briefly as a professor at the college in Haguenau, he was assigned to missionary work in the New World. He went by way of Genoa and Cadiz to Veracruz, Mexico City, and finally Baja California in 1749-1751. Baegert's travels across Europe as well as his experiences in Mexico and Baja California were described in ten letters he wrote to his family (Baegert 1777, 1982).

The new missionary was assigned to work among the Guaycura at Mission San Luis Gonzaga. Initially established as a "visita," or subordinate mission station, by Clemente Guillén in 1721, the mission was founded in 1740 and managed in succession by Lambert Hostell and Johann Bischoff prior to Baegert's arrival. Baegert served at San Luis Gonzaga for the next 17 years, also functioning as a time as the Superior for the California missions.

In 1767 the Spanish king Charles III ordered the expulsion of the Jesuits. As a non-Spanish subject, Baegert traveled back to Sélestat and ultimately settled at Neustadt an der Weinstraße 1770, where he worked as a priest and teacher until he died. He published his description of Baja California in 1771, with a revised edition appearing in 1772 (Baegert 1772, 1952). Jacob Baegert was buried in Neustadt and his simple tombstone is kept there, outside of St. Mary's Catholic Church.

Baegert's book includes an account of the Guaycura language and many other aspects of native culture.

References
Baegert, Johann Jakob. 1772. Nachrichten von der Amerikanischen Halbinsel Californien mit einem zweyfachen Anhand falscher Nachrichten. Churfürstl. Hof- und Academie-Buchdruckerey, Mannheim.
Baegert, Johann Jakob. 1777. "Brief eines Elsässers an seinen Bruder in Schlettstadt". Patriotischer Elsässer. Strassburg.
Baegert, Johann Jakob. 1952. Observations in Lower California. University of California Press, Berkeley.
Baegert, Johann Jakob. 1982. The Letters of Jacob Baegert, 1749–1761, Jesuit Missionary in Baja California. Edited by Doyce B. Nunis, Jr. Dawson's Book Shop, Los Angeles.

External links
  Nachrichten aus der Amerikanischen Halbinsel Californien - online copy of the original book published in Germany in 1772

1717 births
1772 deaths
People from Sélestat
18th-century French Jesuits
Historians of Baja California
History of Baja California
French Roman Catholic missionaries
Roman Catholic missionaries in New Spain
Jesuit missionaries
French people in the Spanish Empire